Larry Silveira (born October 12, 1965) is an American professional golfer who played on the PGA Tour and the Nationwide Tour.

Amateur career
Silveira was originally a baseball player and played catcher for Antioch High School along with former Major League Baseball pitchers Alex Sanchez and Jeff Pico.

Silveira started his college golf career at San Jose State University where he won the Pacific Coast Athletic Association (now the Big West Conference) Conference Championship as a freshman. He then transferred to the University of Arizona where he was named a First Team All American in 1987 and 1988. During his time at Arizona he won five tournaments and in 1988 he won the Pacific-10 Conference (Pac-10) (now the Pac-12 Conference) Championship and was also named the Pac-10 Player of the Year. He was inducted into the University of Arizona Sports Hall of Fame in 1993.

Professional career
Silveira joined the PGA Tour in 1989, earning his Tour card through qualifying school. He struggled during his rookie year but retained his Tour card through qualifying school. In his second year on Tour he continued to struggle but again retained his card through qualifying school. In 1991 he won the Deposit Guaranty Golf Classic, an unofficial PGA Tour event, defeating Mike Nicolette and Russ Cochran in a playoff, but failed to retain his full card. In 1992 he split time between the PGA Tour and the Nationwide Tour and recorded a top-5 finish on each Tour. He played on the Nationwide Tour full-time in 1993 and recorded seven top-10 finishes including three runners-up en route to an eight place finish on the money list, good enough for a PGA Tour card for 1994. He struggled in his return to the PGA Tour and returned to the Nationwide Tour in 1995 where he recorded seven top-10 finishes including two runners-up. He picked up his first Nationwide Tour victory at the Nike San Jose Open in 1996. He rejoined the PGA Tour in 1997 after going through qualifying school for the fourth time. He struggled on Tour and returned to the Nationwide Tour in 1998 where he played sporadically until 2000.

Professional wins (3)

Nike Tour wins (1)

*Note: The 1996 Nike San Jose Open was shortened to 54 holes due to rain.

Nike Tour playoff record (1–1)

Other wins (2)
1988 Arizona Open
1991 Deposit Guaranty Golf Classic (unofficial PGA Tour event)

See also
1988 PGA Tour Qualifying School graduates
1989 PGA Tour Qualifying School graduates
1990 PGA Tour Qualifying School graduates
1993 Nike Tour graduates
1996 PGA Tour Qualifying School graduates

External links

Profile on the Antioch Sports Legends official site

American male golfers
San Jose State Spartans men's golfers
Arizona Wildcats men's golfers
PGA Tour golfers
Korn Ferry Tour graduates
Golfers from California
Sportspeople from Walnut Creek, California
1965 births
Living people